Hard to Believe: A Kiss Covers Compilation is a Kiss tribute album with all of the tracks performed by (at the time) underground, independent, punk bands of the late 1980s. The two bands featured on this album that would continue on to greater success are Nirvana and Melvins, though Doug Martsch of Treepeople later founded Built To Spill. This is one of two released Nirvana recordings with Jason Everman on guitar.

Tracks

Songs that appear on other versions of the album include:
 "Is That You?" (Gerard McMahon) performed by Girl Monstar
 "Sure Know Something" (Stanley, Vini Poncia) performed by The Whipper Snappers 
 "Charisma" (Simmons, Marks) performed by The Plunderers

Various labels
Waterfront Records DAMP-121 (Australia, 8/90 – Double LP, Red Vinyl)
Southern Records DAMP-121 (UK, 8/90 – Single LP in Gatefold)
Records (Europe, 8/90 – Single LP)
C/Z Records CZ-024 (USA, 8/90 – Single LP in Gatefold)

References

External links
Amazon

1992 compilation albums
Kiss (band) tribute albums
C/Z Records compilation albums
Rock compilation albums